Stanislav Yuryevich Murygin (born 7 January 1984) is a Russian former footballer.

External links
  Player page on the official FC Dynamo St. Petersburg website

1984 births
Footballers from Moscow
Living people
Russian footballers
Russia under-21 international footballers
FC Dynamo Moscow players
FC Torpedo Moscow players
FC Khimki players
FC Fakel Voronezh players
Russian Premier League players
FC Vityaz Podolsk players
Association football forwards
FC Dynamo Saint Petersburg players
FC Spartak-MZhK Ryazan players